A photon sieve is a device for focusing light using diffraction and interference. It consists of a flat sheet of material full of pinholes that are arranged in a pattern which is similar to the rings in a Fresnel zone plate, but a sieve brings light to much sharper focus than a zone plate. The sieve concept, first developed in 2001, is versatile because the characteristics of the focusing behaviour can be altered to suit the application by manufacturing a sieve containing holes of several different sizes and different arrangement of the pattern of holes.

Photon sieves have applications to photolithography. and are an alternative to lenses or mirrors in telescopes and terahertz lenses and antennas.

When the size of sieves is smaller than one wavelength of operating light, the traditional method mentioned above to describe the diffraction patterns is not valid. The vectorial theory must be used to approximate the diffraction of light from nanosieves. In this theory, the combination of coupled-mode theory and multiple expansion method is used to give an analytical model, which can facilitate the demonstration of traditional devices such as lenses and holograms.

References

Optical devices